Prionochaeta is a genus of small carrion beetles in the family Leiodidae. There is one described species in Prionochaeta, P. opaca.

References

Further reading

 
 

Leiodidae
Articles created by Qbugbot